On November 3, 1992, Illinois voters approved the Crime Victim Rights Amendment (also known as "Amendment 1"), a legislatively referred constitutional amendment which added Article I, Section 8.1 to the Illinois Constitution of 1970. This amendment guaranteed crime victims certain rights, including the right to receive information about cases in which they are involved.

Constitutional changes
The amendment added Article I, Section 8.1 to the Illinois Constitution of 1970, which read:

Election
In order to be ratified by Illinois voters, the amendment required either 60% support among those specifically voting on the amendment or 50% support among all ballots cast in the elections.

Later history
The 2012 ratification of Marsy's Law amended the Article I Section 8.1 that the amendment had created.

References

Crime Victims Rights Amendment
Crime Victims Rights Amendment